Earl Wilcox Snell (July 11, 1895 – October 28, 1947) was an American politician, businessman, and member of the Republican Party, serving in the Oregon House of Representatives, as the Oregon Secretary of State, and as the 23rd Governor of Oregon. American journalist John Gunther described Snell as "genial, mediocre, and perpetually on the fence."

Early life and business career

Snell was born on a farm near the small town of Olex, Oregon. He grew up in Arlington. He received a public school education, and attended the Oregon Institute of Technology  without attaining a degree (this Oregon Institute of Technology was located in Portland, a private institution, and not connected to the Oregon Institute of Technology in Klamath Falls). He became a partner in Arlington's automobile dealership. After military service during World War I, he settled in nearby Condon, where he married Edith Welshons, with whom he had one son, and published the local newspaper. He became sole owner of the auto dealership in Arlington, and it was his principal livelihood for the rest of his life. He later expanded his business interests to include ranching and banking.

In a WUGA TV interview with well known musician Doc Severinsen, Severinsen—who is from Arlington—reported that he used to live with Snell and his wife during the summers as a boy. Doc stated Snell gave him his first instrument (an army bugle) and strongly influenced him. Snell would also sometimes take Doc down to the Capital building when he was governor.

Political career

After serving on the Arlington City Council, in 1926 he was elected to the first of four consecutive terms in the Oregon House of Representatives, his final term as Speaker. In 1934, despite inroads by Democrats in Oregon in previously Republican Oregon, Snell was elected Oregon Secretary of State, serving from 1935 to 1943.

Prevented by a term limit from seeking another term as Secretary of State, Snell decided to challenge his own party's incumbent Gov. Charles A. Sprague in the Republican primary. He received strong support from the state automobile dealers association, gained the nomination, and went on to be elected Governor with 78 percent of the vote, taking office on January 11, 1943.

Snell's administration was marked by conservationist measures, public works projects and relief programs in line with the federal New Deal programs, and initiatives designed to promote agricultural, timber and industrial interests to expand Oregon's economy. He was re-elected in 1946, by a margin of more than two to one, but died in office the next year.

Death
On October 28, 1947, Snell, Oregon Secretary of State Robert S. Farrell, Jr., and State Senate President Marshall E. Cornett were killed along with pilot Cliff Hogue when their small plane crashed in stormy weather southwest of Dog Lake in Lake County, Oregon. The group left Klamath Falls about 10:00 p.m. en route to a ranch owned by Oscar Kittredge in Warner Valley near Lakeview, Oregon.  A state funeral was held for Snell, Farrell and Cornett at the Capitol in Salem. Snell was buried in Salem's Belcrest Memorial Park.

See also

 1947 Earl Snell plane crash

Footnotes

External links

American military personnel of World War I
Republican Party governors of Oregon
Secretaries of State of Oregon
1895 births
1947 deaths
Speakers of the Oregon House of Representatives
Victims of aviation accidents or incidents in the United States
Accidental deaths in Oregon
Oregon city council members
Oregon Institute of Technology alumni
Republican Party members of the Oregon House of Representatives
20th-century American politicians
Victims of aviation accidents or incidents in 1947
People from Gilliam County, Oregon
People from Condon, Oregon
Military personnel from Oregon
20th-century American Episcopalians